Colonisation or colonization is the process in biology by which a species spreads to new areas. Colonisation often refers to successful immigration where a population becomes integrated into an ecological community, having resisted initial local extinction. In ecology, it is represented by the symbol λ (lowercase lambda) to denote the long-term intrinsic growth rate of a population.

One classic scientific model in biogeography posits that species must continue to colonize new areas through its life cycle (called a taxon cycle) in order to achieve longevity. Accordingly, colonisation and extinction are key components of island biogeography, a theory that has many applications in ecology, such as metapopulations.

Scale
Colonisation occurs on several scales. In the most basic form, as biofilm in the formation of communities of microorganisms on surfaces. In small scales such as colonising new sites, perhaps as a result of environmental change. And on larger scales where a species expands its range to encompass new areas. This can be via a series of small encroachments, such as in woody plant encroachment, or by long-distance dispersal. The term range expansion is also used.

Use
The term is generally only used to refer to the spread of a species into new areas by natural means, as opposed to unnatural introduction or translocation by humans, which may lead to invasive species.

Colonisation events

Large-scale notable pre-historic colonisation events include:

Humans 
 the early human migration and colonisation of areas outside Africa according to the recent African origin paradigm, resulting in the extinction of Pleistocene megafauna, although the role of humans in this event is controversial.

Some large-scale notable colonisation events during the 20th century are:

Birds 
 the colonisation of the New World by the cattle egret and the little egret
 the colonisation of Britain by the little egret
 the colonisation of western North America by the barred owl
 the colonisation of the East Coast of North America by the Brewer's blackbird
 the colonisation-westwards spread across Europe of the collared dove
 the spread across the eastern USA of the house finch
 the expansion into the southern and western areas of South Africa by the Hadeda Ibis

Reptiles 
 the colonisation of Anguilla by Green iguanas following a rafting event in 1995

Dragonflies 
the colonisation of Britain by the small red-eyed damselfly

Moths
the colonisation of Britain by Blair's shoulder-knot

See also
Colony (biology)
Invasive species
Pioneer species

References

Community ecology
Ecological processes
Ecology terminology